Backhousia sciadophora is a common Australian tree, growing from near Dungog in New South Wales to near Kilcoy in south east Queensland. Common names include Shatterwood, Ironwood, Boomerang Tree and Curracabark. The habitat of Shatterwood is drier forms of rainforest in gorges and steep slopes, usually not on volcanic soils.

Description 
Shatterwood is a small to medium size tree, occasionally reaching 30 metres in height and 80 cm in trunk diameter. The tree's crown appears dark and attractive.

The trunk of Backhousia sciadophora is cylindrical, and often flanged or buttressed at the base. Shatterwood is so named because of the brittle nature of the timber.

The bark is grey or fawn, rough with short fibres, finely vertically fissured, shedding in narrow scales. The bark structure appears to consist of numerous paper like layers.

Leaves, flowers and fruit 

The leaves are opposite, simple, entire, broadly ovate or elliptical, 5 to 10 cm long. Round or drawn into a blunt point, or sometimes notched.  Oil dots small and numerous. Leaf stalks very short.

Leaf venation includes a looping intermarginal vein, well removed from the leaf's edge. A second intermarginal leaf vein is present, closer to the leaf edge. The midrib vein is sunken on the lower surface, but slightly raised above.

Flowers are white, small and numerous. Flowering period from June to July. The fruit matures from May to August, being a brown capsule, bell shaped, 5 mm in diameter including the five persistent calyx lobes, 2 mm long. Seeds five to eight in each fruit, oval, 1 mm long, golden brown in colour.

References

  (other publication details, included in citation)

sciadophora
Myrtales of Australia
Trees of Australia
Flora of New South Wales
Flora of Queensland
Dungog Shire
Taxa named by Ferdinand von Mueller